
This is an alphabetical index of people, places, things, and concepts related to or originating from the Republic of Venice (AD 697–1797). Feel free to add more, and create missing pages.

A

 Accademia degli Incogniti
 Accademia Veneziana
 Agnadello, Battle of
 Archipelago, Duchy of the
 Venetian Albania
 Albanian–Venetian War
 Aquileia
 Anafesto, Paolo Lucio
 Angelokastro (Corfu)
 Antenori, Obelerio degli
 Santi Apostoli, Venice
 Army of the Republic of Venice
 Venetian Arsenal
 Avogadoria de Comùn

B

 Bagnolo, Treaty of
 Bailo
 Bailo of Constantinople
 Bailo of Corfu
 Bailo of Negroponte
 Barbaro, Marcantonio
 Barbo, Pantaleone
 Barozzi family
 Barozzi, Andrea
 Barozzi, Andrea II
 Barozzi, Angelo
 Barozzi, Elena
 Barozzi, Francesco
 Barozzi, Francesco
 Barozzi, Giovanni
 Barozzi, Iacopo
 Barozzi, Iacopo II
 Barozzi, Pietro
 Bassano, Jacopo
 Bellini, Gentile
 Bellini, Giovanni
 Bellini, Jacopo
 Bembo, Marco
 Bergamo
 Biblioteca Marciana
 Bourtzi Castle
 Bragadin, Marco Antonio
 Brescia
 Bucentaur
 Byzantine civil war of 1341–1347
 Byzantine civil war of 1373–1379

C

 Camerlenghi di Comun
 Campo Formio, Treaty of
 Candia, Kingdom of
 Candiano, Pietro I
 Candiano, Pietro II
 Candiano, Pietro III
 Candiano, Pietro IV
 Candiano, Vitale
 Cappello, Girolamo
 Capitano delle Navi
 Capitano Straordinario delle Navi
 Captain General of the Sea
 Captain of the Gulf
 Carmini
 Carnival of Venice
 Ca' Tron
 Ca' Vendramin Calergi
 Censori
 Ceparius, Jovian
 Cephalonia
 Chioggia, Battle of
 Chronicon Altinate
 Chronicon Venetum et Gradense
  Cicogna, Pasquale
 San Clemente, Venice
 Codex Baroccianus
 Coinage of the Republic of Venice
 Commune of Venice
 Concio
 Constantinople
 Constantinople, 1454 Treaty of
 Constantinople, 1479 Treaty of
 Contarini, Alvise (Diplomat)
 Contarini, Francesco
 Corfu
 Cornaro (Corner) family
 Cornaro, Andrea (Marquess of Bodonitsa)
 Cornaro, Catherine
 Cornaro, Federico, died 1382
 Cornaro, Federico, died 1590
 Cornaro, Federico Baldissera Bartolomeo
 Cornaro, Felicia
 Cornaro, Francesco (Doge)
 Cornaro, Giorgio
 Cornaro, Giovanni I
 Cornaro, Giovanni II
 Cornaro, Laura
 Cornaro, Marco
 Cornaro, Pietro
 Cornicola, Felice
 Corona-class ship of the line
 Correr family
 Correr, Pietro, Latin Patriarch of Constantinople
 Cremona
 Cremona, 1270 Peace of
 Cremona, 1441 Peace of
 Cretan War (1645–1669)
 Crete (Candia)
 Crete, List of rulers of
 Croatian–Venetian wars
 Cyprus under Venetian rule

D

 Dalmatia under Venetian rule
 Dandolo family
 Dandolo, Andrea (Doge)
 Dandolo, Andrea (Admiral)
 Dandolo, Anna
 Dandolo, Enrico
 Dandolo, Francesco
 Dandolo, Giovanna
 Dandolo, Giovanni
 Dondulo, Jacopo
 Dandolo, Marino
 Dandolo, Raniero
 Dandolo, Zilia
 Diedo, Marcantonio
 Dogado
 Dogaressa
 Doge
 Doge of Venice
 Dolfin or Delfin family
 Dolfin, Caterina
 Dolfin, Dolfin
 Dolfin, Giovanni
 Dolfin, Giovanni, bishop of Brescia
  Donato, Girolamo
 Dubrovnik

E

 Economic history of Venice
 Esecutori contro la bestemmia

F

 Fabriacus, John
 Faliero, Marino
 Fall of the Republic of Venice
 Flag of the Republic of Venice
 Flanginian School
 Fondaco dei Tedeschi
 Fondaco dei Turchi
 Council of Forty
 Francesco's Mediterranean Voyage
Full College

G

 Galbaio, Giovanni
 Galbaio, Maurizio
 Galeas per montes
 Gallipoli, Treaty of
 San Giorgio dei Greci
 Giorgione
 Giustiniani family
 Giustinian, Pantaleone
 Giustiniani, Pompeo
 Pietro Gradenigo
 Grimani family
  Grimari, Antonio
  Grimari, Domenico
 Grimari, Domenico
 Grimari, Marino
  Grimari, Pietro
 Glass manufacture in Venice
 Gothic architecture in Venice
 Governatore dei condannati
 Great Council of Venice
 Great Turkish War
 Greek community in Venice
  Gritti, Alvise

H

 History of the Republic of Venice
 A History of Venice

I

 Inquisistion in the Republic of Venice
 Intercursus Magnus
 Ionian Islands under Venetian rule
 Ipato, Orso
 Ipato, Teodato
 Istria under Venetian rule
 Italian War of 1494–1498
 Italian War of 1521–1526
 Italian Wars of 1499–1504
 Italic League

J

K

 Karlowitz, Treaty of
 Kassiopi Castle
 Koroni (Coron)
 Kotor (Cattaro)
 Fortifications of Kotor
 Kythira (Cerigo)

L

 La Motta, 1513 Battle of
 Lando, Pietro
 Lefkada (Santa Maura)
 Leoben, Treaty of
 Leoni, Domenico
 Leon Trionfante-class ship of the line
 Loredan family
 Loredan, Alvise
 Loredan, Andrea (Admiral)
 Loredan, Antonio
 Loredan, Caterina
 Loredan, Francesco
 Loredan, Giorgio
 Loredan, Giovanni
 Loredan, Giovanni (Lord of Antiparos)
 Loredan, Leonardo
 Loredan, Marco
 Loredan, Pietro
 Loredan, Pietro (Doge)
 Loredan, Zanotto
 Loredan, Giovanni Francesco
 Loredano, Paolina
 Lords of the Night (Venice)
 Lotto, Lorenzo

M

 Madrid, 1617 treaty of
 Magistrato alle Acque
 Magistrato alle Pompe
 Magistrato alla Sanità
 Malipiero, Pasquale
 Manin, Ludovico
 Marcello, Lorenzo
 Marcello, Nicolò
 Santa Maria degli Angeli, Murano
 Santa Maria dei Derelitti
 Santa Maria Formosa
 Santa Maria Mater Domini
 Marin Bocconio
 Marriage of the Sea ceremony
 San Martino, Venice
 Memmo, Tribuno
 Methoni Castle
 San Michele in Isola
 Milanese War of Succession
 Military history of the Republic of Venice
 Minor Council
 Mocenigo family
 Mocenigo, Andrea
 Mocenigo, Alvise I
 Mocenigo, Alvise II
 Mocenigo, Giovanni
 Mocenigo, Lazzaro
 Mocenigo, Pietro
 Mocenigo, Sebastiano
 Mocenigo, Tommaso
 Modon, 1403 Battle of
 Monegario, Domenico
 More veneto
 Morea, Kingdom of the
 Morean War
 Morlachs (Venetian irregulars)
 Moro, Cristoforo
 Morosini family
 Morosini, Aliodea
 Morosini, Domenico
 Morosini, Giovan Francesco (Cardinal)
 Morosini, Giovan Francesco (Patriarch of Venice)
 Morosini, Francesco
 Morosini, John
 Morosini, Lodovico
 Morosini, Marino
 Morosini, Michele
 Morosini, Morosina
 Morosini, Tomasina
 Miglani, Nicolò
 Muda (convoy)

N

 Nani, Giovan Battista
 Navigajoso, Nicolò
 Navy of the Republic of Veince
 Negroponte, Triarchy of
 New Fortress
 Nobility of the Republic of Venice
 Nymphaeum, 1261 Treaty of

O

 Ognissanti, Venice
 Old Fortress, Corfu
 Order of Saint Mark
 Orseolo, Otto
 Orseolo, Pietro I
 Orseolo, Pietro II
 Orvieto, Treaty of
 Ottoman–Venetian War (1463–1479)
 Ottoman–Venetian War (1499–1503)
 Ottoman–Venetian War (1537–1540)
 Ottoman–Venetian War (1570–1573)
 Ottoman–Venetian War (1714–1718)

P

 Pactum Lotharii
 Pactum Warmundi
 Padua
 Padua, 1509 Siege of
 Padua, War of
 Palamidi
 Palazzo Adoldo
 Palazzo Balbi, Venice
 Palazzo Barbarigo
 Palazzo Barbarigo della Terrazza
 Palazzo Bernardo Nani
 Palazzo Boldù a San Felice
 Palazzo Bonfadini Vivante
 Palazzo Brandolin Rota
 Palazzo Caotorta-Angaran
 Palazzo Contarini Dal Zaffo
 Palazzo Contarini delle Figure
 Palazzo Corner della Ca' Grande
 Palazzo Corner Spinelli
 Palazzo Correr Contarini Zorzi
 Palazzo Curti Valmarana
 Palazzo D'Anna Viaro Martinengo Volpi di Misurata
 Palazzo Dandolo Paolucci
 Palazzo dei Camerlenghi
 Palazzo dei Dieci Savi
 Palazzo Dolfin Manin
 Palazzo Donà Balbi
 Palazzo Giustinian Persico
 Palazzo Giustinian Recanati
 Palazzo Grimani di Santa Maria Formosa
 Palazzo Grimani Marcello
 Palazzo Gritti
 Palazzo Gussoni Grimani Della Vida
 Palazzo Malipiero-Trevisan
 Palazzo Molina, Venice
 Palazzo Nani
 Palazzo Querini Benzon
 Palazzo Querini Dubois
 Palazzo Soranzo Piovene
 Palazzo Tiepolo
 Palazzo Zorzi Galeoni
 Palma il Giovane
 Palma Vecchio
 Parga Castle
 Paris, 1623 Treaty of
 Partitio terrarum imperii Romaniae
 Participazio, Agnello
 Participazio, Giovanni I
 Participazio, Giovanni II
 Participazio, Giustiniano
 Participazio, Orso I
 Participazio, Orso II
 Participazio, Pietro
 Passarowitz, Treaty of
 Patras
 Patria del Friuli
 Patriarchate of Venice
 Pax Alexii Callergi
 Pax Nicephori
 Pesaro, Benedetto
 Piazza San Marco
 Pisani, Andrea (Admiral)
 Domenico Pisani
 Pisani, Vettor
 di Pitigliano, Niccolò
 Polesella, Battle of
 da Polenta, Obizzo
 da Polenta, Ostasio III
 Portrait of Doge Leonardo Loredan
 Procuratie
 Procurators of Saint Mark
 Promissione ducale
 Provveditore
 Provveditore all'Armata
 Provveditore Generale da Mar

Q

R

 Ravenna
 Relazione
 Renaissance in Venice
 Renaissance architecture in Venice
 Renier, Paolo
 Republic of Venice
 Rethymno (Retimo)
 Riformatori dello studio di Padova
 Riva degli Schiavoni
 Roccafortis
 Ruzzini, Carlo

S

 San Carlo Borromeo-class ship of the line
 San Lorenzo Zustinian-class ship of the line
 Sanudo family
 Sanudo, Angelo
 Sanudo, Cristina
 Sanudo, Florence
 Sanudo, John I
 Sanudo, Marco I
 Sanudo, Marco II
 Sanudo, Marco, lord of Gridi
 Sanudo, Marco, lord of Milos
 Sanudo, Maria
 Sanudo, Nicholas I
 Sanudo, Nicholas II
 Sanudo, William I
 Sapienza, Battle of
 Sapienza, Treaty of
 Saseno, Battle of
 Savi agli Ordini
 Savi del Consiglio
 Savi di Terraferma 
 Savio ai Ceremoniali
 Savio ai da mò
 Savio alla Scrittura
 Savio alle Ordinanze
 Savio Cassier
 Schiavone
 Schiavonesca
 Scuola dei Greci
 Scuola di San Giorgio degli Schiavoni
 Scuole Grandi of Venice
 Sebastiano del Piombo
 Selymbria, Treaty of
 Senate of Venice
 Serrata del Maggior Consiglio
 Sestiere (Venice)
 Settepozzi, Battle of
 Shkodër
 Šibenik (Sebenico)
 Signoria of Venice
 Sopracomito
 Stato da Màr
 Steno, Michele
 Stratioti
 Sveti Srdj, Treaty of

T

 Tegalliano, Marcello
 Council of Ten
 Terraferma, Dominions of the
 Timeline of the Republic of Venice
 Thessalonica
 Thessalonica, 1422–1430 Siege of
 Tiepolo, Jacopo
 Tiepolo, Lorenzo
 Tintoretto
 Titian
 Tradonico, Pietro
 Trapani, Battle of
 Turin, 1381 Treaty of
 Treaty with Byzantium, 1082
 Treaty with Byzantium, 1277
 Treaty with Byzantium, 1268
 Treaty with Nicaea, 1219
 Treaty with the Ottoman Empire, 1419
 Treviso
 Tribuno, Pietro

U

 Udine
 Uskoks

V

 Valdrada of Sicily
 Valier, Silvestro
 Vendramin family
 Vendramin, Andrea
 Venetian bombardments of the Beylik of Tunis (1784–1788)
 Venetian Ghetto
 Venetian School (music)
 Venetian school (art)
 Venetian Works of Defence between the 16th and 17th centuries: Stato da Terra – Western Stato da Mar
 Venice
 Venier family
 Venier, Andrea
 Venier, Antonio
 Venier, Francesco
 Venier, Pietro, governor of Cerigo
 Venier, Sebastiano
 Verona
 Veronese Easter
 Veronese, Paolo
 Vetrego
 Via Argentaria
 Via de Zenta
 Vicenza
 Vitus of Kotor

W

 War of the Euboeote Succession
 War of Saint Sabas
 War with Byzantium (1171)
 War with Byzantium (1296–1302)
 Wars with Genoa
 Wars with the Ottoman Empire

Z

 San Zaccaria, Venice
 Zadar (Zara)
 Zadar, Treaty of
 Zakynthos (Zante)
 Zane, Girolamo
 Zane, Matteo
 Zecca of Venice
 Zeno, Carlo
 Zeno, Pietro (died 1345)
 Zeno, Pietro
 Zeno, Reniero
 Le Zitelle
 Zulian family
 Zulian, Girolamo
 Polo Zuliani, Zuliani, Polo

See also
 Index of Byzantine Empire–related articles
 Index of Italy-related articles

Venice, Republic of
Venice, Republic of
Republic of Venice